Austrobuxus montis-do is a species of plant in the Picrodendraceae family. It is endemic to New Caledonia.

References

Picrodendraceae
Endemic flora of New Caledonia
Conservation dependent plants
Near threatened flora of Oceania
Taxonomy articles created by Polbot